The 4.25mm Liliput is a centerfire cartridge originally produced in Austria for self-loading pocket pistols made by Erika before World War I.  In 1920 the Liliput pistol was designed by August Menz of Suhl to use the cartridge.  The cartridge became best known by the Liliput name used on German ammunition after Austria ceased production.  The cartridge headspaces on the mouth of the case.  It was the smallest centerfire cartridge in production in the 1930s.

See also 
 List of cartridges by caliber

References

External links
Pictures of the 4.25mm Liliput cartridge, compared to the 2mm Kolibri rounds.

Pistol and rifle cartridges